The BIT International College (BIT-IC), formerly the Bohol Institute of Technology or BIT , is a private, non-sectarian, co-educational tertiary institution of higher learning in Tagbilaran City, Bohol, Philippines.

The school was founded by University of Bohol alumnus Atty. Dionisio Balite with his wife Dr. Lilia Balite in 1981.

It offers college courses, primary and secondary education. It is situated along 100 Gallares Street, and has branches in the towns of Talibon, Jagna, and Carmen in Bohol, as well as in the province of Siquijor, and in Butuan where it is using the trade name Balite Institute of Technology.

Campuses
Bohol Institute of Technology - Carmen, Bohol
Bohol Institute of Technology - Jagna, Bohol
Bohol Institute of Technology - Tagbilaran City
Bohol Institute of Technology - Talibon, Bohol

External links 
 BIT International College official website
 
 Tagbilaran City education social sector
 BIT International College official forum page

Universities and colleges in Bohol
Educational institutions established in 1981
Education in Tagbilaran
1981 establishments in the Philippines